Hannah is an unincorporated community in southern Douglas County, Georgia, United States.

Nearby community
The nearby community is Fairplay.

External links

Unincorporated communities in Douglas County, Georgia
Unincorporated communities in Georgia (U.S. state)